"My Name Is Jonas" is a song by the American rock band Weezer. It is the first track on the band's self-titled 1994 debut album, also known as The Blue Album. It was written by guitarist/vocalist Rivers Cuomo, drummer Patrick Wilson and guitarist Jason Cropper, and produced by Ric Ocasek. Cropper wrote the song's acoustic intro; it is his only Weezer songwriting credit, as he left the band before the release of its first album.

Background
The song was inspired by Cuomo's brother, who was having insurance problems after a serious car crash while at college. According to Cuomo, the song "explains how The Plan is reaming us all, especially my brother."

"My Name Is Jonas" was written in the key of B major. However, as the song is played with guitars tuned a half-step down, it is played as if it were in the key of C.

Reception
Melissa Bobbitt at LiveAbout named "My Name is Jonas" the seventh best Weezer song, writing that its lyric "the workers are going home" was "a righteous way to kick off a weekend". Michael Gallucci from Diffuser named it the third best Weezer song. In his 2010 book Music: What Happened?, Scott Miller describes the song as "musicality everywhere, theatrical dynamics, little golden lyric details where the subplot reveals the whole mood."

In other media
This song is featured in the video game Guitar Hero III: Legends of Rock as a playable track, and was released as a downloadable song for the Rock Band series and Rocksmith 2014.

Covers

Affinity covered the song on the album Rock Music: A Tribute to Weezer.

In 2021, Taking Back Sunday released a cover of the song as a single.

Personnel
Rivers Cuomo – lead vocals, lead guitar, harmonica, rhythm guitar
Patrick Wilson – drums
Brian Bell – backing vocals
Matt Sharp – bass, backing vocals
Ric Ocasek – producer
Chris Shaw - engineer

References

Weezer songs
1994 songs
Songs written by Rivers Cuomo
Song recordings produced by Ric Ocasek
Songs written by Jason Cropper
Songs written by Patrick Wilson (musician)